A Sleeping Clergyman is a 1933 play in Two Acts by James Bridie. Directed by H. K. Ayliff, it opened at Malvern's Festival Theatre in July 1933, before moving to London's Piccadilly Theatre in September, where it ran for 230 performances. It then transferred to Broadway's Guild Theatre in October 1934, where it closed after 40 performances. It was revived, again with Robert Donat, at London’s Criterion Theatre in 1947.

Plot
Hereditary evil runs through three generations of a medical family, in the 'conflict of social morality and natural desires' - the dissolute and murderous Camerons (from 1867 to 1935) -  before a son and daughter finally redeem the family name.

Original cast
A Sleeping Clergyman ... Godfrey Baxter
Dr. Cooper ... Wilson Coleman
Dr. Coots ... Alexander Sarner
Wilkinson ... Frank Moore
Charles Cameron the First ... Robert Donat
Mrs. Hannah ... Beatrix Feilden-Kaye
Dr. Marshall ... Ernest Thesiger
Harriet Marshall ... Dorice Fordred
Cousin Minnie ... Sophie Stewart
Aunt Walker ... Isabel Thornton
Wilhelmina Cameron ... Dorice Fordred
John Hannah ... Bruce Belfrage
A Sergeant ... Arthur Hambling
A Constable ... John Rae
Charles Cameron the Second ... Robert Donat
Donovan ... Walter Roy
Lady Todd Walker ... Eileen Beldon
Sir Douglas Todd Walker ... Evelyn Roberts
Hope Cameron ... Dorice Fordred
Little Thing ... Phyllis Shand
Dr. Purley ... Whitmore Humphreys
Lady Katherine Helliwell ... Pamela Carme
Dr. Coutts ... Alexander Sarner
A Medical Student ... Kenneth Fraser

Adaptations
The play was later adapted for radio and broadcast on the BBC's Saturday Night Theatre on 1 January 1949. A televised version was also broadcast by the BBC, in its Sunday Night Theatre slot on 11 January 1959.

References

External links
 

1933 plays
West End plays
Plays by James Bridie